Hoʻokena may refer to:

 Hoʻokena (group), Hawaiian music trio
 Hoʻokena beach, beach and village in Kona, Hawaii